The Sadar Bazaar Cantonment metro station is located on the Magenta Line of the Delhi Metro. It was opened to public on 29 May 2018.

History

Construction

The station

Structure
Sadar Bazaar Cantonment elevated metro station is situated on the Magenta Line of Delhi Metro.

Station layout

Facilities
List of available ATM at Sadar Bazaar Cantonment metro station are,

Entry/Exit

Connections

See also

Delhi
List of Delhi Metro stations
Transport in Delhi
Delhi Metro Rail Corporation
Delhi Suburban Railway
Delhi Monorail
Delhi Transport Corporation
South West Delhi
National Capital Region (India)
List of rapid transit systems
List of metro systems

References

External links

 Delhi Metro Rail Corporation Ltd. (Official site)
 Delhi Metro Annual Reports
 
 UrbanRail.Net – descriptions of all metro systems in the world, each with a schematic map showing all stations.

Delhi Metro stations
Railway stations in West Delhi district